Dennstaedtia davallioides, commonly known as the  lacy ground fern, is a species of fern native to eastern Australia, from the Bunya Mountains in central Queensland south through  eastern New South Wales, and into Victoria southwest to the Otway Ranges.

It requires some shelter when cultivated, as can easily be damaged by wind and sun. A moisture retentive soil is beneficial. Plants can be attacked by green caterpillars in cultivation.

References

davallioides
Ferns of Australia
Flora of Queensland
Flora of Victoria (Australia)
Flora of New South Wales
Taxa named by Robert Brown (botanist, born 1773)
Plants described in 1810